Lewis Cohen may refer to:

 Lewis Cohen (mayor) (1849–1933), South Australian politician and several times mayor of Adelaide
 Lewis Cohen (cardmaker) (1800–1868), major player in the playing card business
 Lewis Cohen, Baron Cohen of Brighton, British politician